The 2006 Asian Junior Badminton Championships were held at the Kuala Lumpur Badminton Stadium in Kuala Lumpur, Malaysia from 3–9 July. There were 24 countries competed in this championships.

Medalists

Medal table

References

External links 
 badmintoncentral.com
 Results at www.badminton.or.jp

Badminton Asia Junior Championships
Asian Junior Badminton Championships
Asian Junior Badminton Championships
International sports competitions hosted by Malaysia
2006 in youth sport